Panabo, officially the City of Panabo, is a 3rd class component city in the province of Davao del Norte, Philippines. According to the 2020 census, it has a population of 209,230 people.

Panabo is part of Davao Metropolitan Area as it shares borders with Davao City. The Panabo City Hall is located about 2.23 kilometers from its boundary with Davao City.

Etymology
The name Panabo originated from the phrase "pana-sa-boboy" where "pana" means "arrow", the tool which the original inhabitants of the place, the Aetas, use when hunting wild animals for food.

History
Originally the rich lowland of what today is Panabo was inhabited by a group of natives called Aetas. These people led nomadic life and lived by hunting. With the use of their most essential tool, the bow and arrow—"pana-sa-boboy" as they call it—they hunted for food which primarily consisted of rootcrops and meat of wild boars.

Settlers and pioneers from the Visayas and Luzon started to flock the place during the early 1900s in search of a new life in the region. When the first batch of settlers arrived on the place, in what is now the urban core of the city, they found out that it was already a thriving community, and thus called it Taboan, or trading center. Feeling alienated with the massive influx of settlers in the region, the Aeta natives moved further into the hinterlands to the west, thus ensuring that the settler inhabitants become the majority of the population. The new inhabitants started to name the place as Panabo, named after the bow and arrow that the Aeta natives always carry.

Panabo, until then only a mere barangay of Tagum, then known as Magugpo during that time, became a town on July 19, 1949, through Presidential Proclamation No. 236 of the President Manuel A. Roxas.

The Tagum Agricultural Development Company, otherwise known as TADECO, was founded on December 20, 1950, in the town of Panabo. It was the birth of the world's largest Cavendish banana plantation that saw the mass employment of the locals seeking for jobs, and the start of unprecedented growth of the town as even larger throngs of Visayan migrants settled on the town eager to join the plantation's workforce. Large areas of forests were cleared to make way for the banana trees under TADECO. The town of Panabo grew both in economic terms and population as decades passed since the founding of TADECO and numerous businesses were then set up locally, until the conditions finally warranted for its conversion into a city.

Cityhood

The local government unit of Panabo was created into a component city of Davao del Norte by virtue of Republic Act No. 9015 and ratified by the residents in a plebiscite held on March 31, 2001. However, its official existence as a municipal corporation took effect on with the appointment of new set of officials.

Geography
The city of Panabo has a total land area of 251.23 km2. It was bordered by the shores of Davao Gulf to the east, by Davao City to its west and south, and some of the municipalities of Davao del Norte in the north. The western part of the city featured hills while the rest were flatlands.

Climate

Barangays
Panabo is politically subdivided into 40 barangays. Quezon was formerly the sitio of Cabili; it became a barrio in 1957.

Demographics

Economy

Being an agro-industrial city, Panabo is known as the "Banana Capital of the Philippines" due to numerous banana plantations scattered throughout the city. In fact, Panabo is the home of the world's biggest banana plantation, which is owned by the Tagum Agricultural Development Company (TADECO), which covers around 6,900 hectares of banana fields and produce millions of boxes of export-quality bananas annually. The city itself cultivated 40% of its land or around 10,000 hectares into planting export-quality Cavendish bananas. Thus, banana cultivation and exportation are the main economic lifeblood of the city.

Infrastructure

There are two privately owned port facilities in the city, which enabled them to export various fruits, such as bananas, mangoes, papayas, and pineapples, to countries like Japan, South Korea, China, and countries as far in the Middle East and the European Union.

Public infrastructure includes the Freedom Park which features a unique banana inspired fountain sculpted by the world class artist Kublai Millan. The Panabo Multi-Purpose Cooperative Tourism Gymnasium, located beside the City Hall is also a public infrastructure, the gymnasium accommodates an estimated ten-thousand people and also serves as playing venue of the Philippine Basketball Association as well as serving concerts for the city.

Transportation
Panabo is served by the 6-lane Maharlika Highway and is a highway road junction heading to the TADECO banana plantation as well as to other parts of Davao del Norte and the northernmost areas of Davao City. Tricycles and jeepneys are the main mode of transportation in the city, while passenger buses and public utility vans serve overland routes within and outside the city.

Education

Tertiary education

Universities
 University of Mindanao, Panabo College (private)
 Davao del Norte State College (public)

Colleges
 ACES Polytechnic College, Inc.
 Maryknoll College of Panabo, Inc.
 North Davao Colleges
 NorthLink Technological College, Inc.
 Valiant Technological College
 Northern Paramedical and Technological College, Inc.
 The Leores Training Academy Inc.

Secondary education

High-schools

A memorandum of agreement between UP Los Baños College of Agriculture and ANFLOCOR was signed for the establishment of UP Professional School for Agriculture and the Environment (UP PSAE) which will be UPLB's extension campus in Panabo City. In addition, UP Mindanao will also collaborate on some courses and programs to be offered.

Notable personalities

 Jerwin Ancajas, boxer
 Dennis Denora, journalist and publisher
 Thor Dulay, The Voice Ph semifinalist
 Jasmine Bacurnay Lee, Korean actress and politician

Sister cities

Local
 Cotabato City
 Ozamiz
 Pagadian
 Parañaque

References

External links

 Panabo Profile at the DTI Cities and Municipalities Competitive Index
 
 [ Philippine Standard Geographic Code]
Philippine Census Information
Local Governance Performance Management System

Cities in Davao del Norte
Populated places established in 1949
1949 establishments in the Philippines
Component cities in the Philippines